Dodd City High School is a public high school located in Dodd City, Texas, United States. It is part of the Dodd City Independent School District located in central Fannin County and classified as a 1A school by the UIL.  In 2015, the school was rated "Met Standard" by the Texas Education Agency.

Athletics
The Dodd City Hornets compete in these sports - 

Volleyball, Basketball, Golf, Tennis, Track, Softball & Baseball

State Championships

 Boys Golf-John Burpo 2002

State Titles
Girls Basketball - 
2021(1A)

Softball - 
2021(1A)

State Finalists

Girls Basketball - 
2002(1A/D2)
2017 (1A/D2)
2018 (1A/D2)
2019 (1A/D2)

State Semifinalist

Girls Softball
 2003(1A)
 2017(1A)
 2019(1A)

References

External links
Dodd City ISD

Schools in Fannin County, Texas
Public high schools in Texas